Cleve Loney (November 5, 1950 – August 22, 2020) was an American politician who served as a Republican member of the Montana House of Representatives from 2011 to 2013. He was elected to House District 25 which represents part of the Great Falls area.

Biography
Cleve Loney was born in Great Falls on November 5, 1950, and raised on a ranch. He attended high school in Highwood, Montana. Graduating in 1969, he went to Sheridan Junior College on a rodeo scholarship. During this time he won a Regional Championship in the Saddle Bronc Riding. Cleve transferred to Montana State University, where he was on the National Championship Rodeo Team in 1972, graduating in 1976 with a B.S. Degree in Agricultural Production. In 1990 he was inducted into the MSU Athletics Hall of Fame.

Loney died on August 22, 2020, in Great Falls, Montana at age 69. He drowned in the Missouri River after his kayak tipped over.

References

1950 births
2020 deaths
21st-century American politicians
Politicians from Great Falls, Montana
Businesspeople from Montana
Republican Party members of the Montana House of Representatives
Montana State University alumni
Accidental deaths in Montana
Deaths by drowning in the United States